The 42nd Infantry Regiment is an inactive infantry regiment in the United States Army.

History

Lineage
Constituted 15 May 1917 in the Regular Army as the 42nd Infantry. Organized 24 June 1917 at Fort Douglas, Utah from personnel of the 20th Infantry. Assigned to the 12th Infantry Division 5 July 1918. Relieved from the 12th Division 31 January 1919. Inactivated by elements at Camp Gillard, Canal Zone, as follows- Headquarters and Headquarters Company, 30 April 1927. 1st Battalion, 14 March 1927. 2nd Battalion, 18 April 1927.

Allotted to the Second Corps Area 28 February 1927. Affiliated with University of Puerto Rico 18 April 1930. Organized 1 February 1939 at Rio Piedras, Puerto Rico. Disbanded 11 November 1944.

Distinctive unit insignia
 Description
A Gold color metal and enamel device  in height consisting of a shield blazoned: Azure, semé of bees Or, a cross Argent, on a canton of the last two saltires of the field.
 Symbolism
The shield is blue for Infantry. The Regiment was organized at Fort Douglas, Utah, in May 1917, from the 20th Infantry which is shown on the canton. The bees are taken from the arms of Utah. The Regiment is now recruited from Puerto Rico shown by the cross taken from the old banner of the island.
 Background
The distinctive unit insignia was approved on 14 November 1923. It was rescinded/cancelled on 28 January 1959.

Coat of arms
Blazon
 Shield
Azure, semé of bees Or, a cross Argent, on a canton of the last two saltires of the field.
 Crest- None
 Motto- None
 Symbolism
 Shield- The shield is blue for Infantry. The Regiment was organized at Fort Douglas, Utah, in May 1917, from the 20th Infantry which is shown on the canton. The bees are taken from the arms of Utah. The Regiment is now recruited from Puerto Rico shown by the cross taken from the old banner of the island.
 Crest- None.
 Background- The coat of arms was approved on 4 June 1921. It was rescinded/cancelled on 28 January 1959.

See also
 Distinctive unit insignia

References

 Historical register and dictionary of the United States Army, from ..., Volume 1 By Francis Bernard Heitman 
 Encyclopedia of United States Army insignia and uniforms By William K. Emerson (page 51).
  lineage

External links
 http://www.history.army.mil/html/forcestruc/lineages/branches/av/default.htm

0042